Iran Khodro Metro Station is a station in Tehran Metro Line 5. It is located north of Tehran-Karaj Freeway and near Iran Khodro factory. It is between Chitgar Metro Station and Vardavard Metro Station.

References

Tehran Metro stations